The Palms is a small national park located between Cooyar and Yarraman in Queensland, Australia. The main feature of the park is spring-fed gully filled with piccabeen palms. Strangler figs, bunya pines and hoop pines also predominate.

The 12.4 ha park was proclaimed in 1950. The birdlife in the park is prolific.

No camping is allowed in the park but picnics and bushwalks are catered for.

See also

 Protected areas of Queensland

References

National parks of Queensland
Protected areas established in 1950
1950 establishments in Australia